Burkina Faso competed at the 2020 Summer Olympics in Tokyo. Originally scheduled to take place from 24 July to 9 August 2020, the Games were postponed to 23 July to 8 August 2021, because of the COVID-19 pandemic. It was the nation's tenth appearance at the Summer Olympics, having participated since the 1972 Summer Olympics in Munich under the name Upper Volta. 

Hugues Fabrice Zango won Burkina Faso's first ever Olympic medal, earning the bronze in the men's triple jump.

Medalists

Competitors
The following is the list of number of competitors in the Games.

Athletics

Burkinabé athletes achieved the entry standards, either by qualifying time or by world ranking, in the following track and field events (up to a maximum of 3 athletes in each event):

Track & road events

Field events

Combined events – Women's heptathlon

Cycling

Road
Burkina Faso entered one rider to compete in the men's road race for the first time in history, by finishing in the top two, not yet qualified, at the 2019 African Championships in Addis Ababa, Ethiopia.

Judo
 
Burkina Faso qualified one judoka for the men's lightweight category (73 kg) at the Games. Lucas Diallo accepted a continental berth from Africa as the nation's top-ranked judoka outside of direct qualifying position in the IJF World Ranking List of June 28, 2021.

Swimming

Burkina Faso received a universality invitation from FINA to send two top-ranked swimmers (one per gender) in their respective individual events to the Olympics, based on the FINA Points System of June 28, 2021.

Taekwondo
 
For the first time in history, Burkina Faso received an invitation from the Tripartite Commission and the World Taekwondo Federation to send Faysal Sawadogo in the men's welterweight category (80 kg) to the Olympics.

References

External links
 Burkina Faso at the 2020 Summer Olympics at Olympedia

Nations at the 2020 Summer Olympics
2020
2021 in Burkinabé sport